Leticia Robles Colín (born 21 February 1960) is a Mexican politician from the Institutional Revolutionary Party. She has  served as Deputy of the LVII and LXI Legislatures of the Mexican Congress representing the Federal District.

References

1960 births
Living people
Politicians from Mexico City
Women members of the Chamber of Deputies (Mexico)
Institutional Revolutionary Party politicians
21st-century Mexican politicians
21st-century Mexican women politicians
Members of the Congress of Mexico City
Deputies of the LVII Legislature of Mexico
Deputies of the LXI Legislature of Mexico
Members of the Chamber of Deputies (Mexico) for Mexico City